Paracles rudis is a moth of the subfamily Arctiinae first described by Arthur Gardiner Butler in 1882. It is found in Chile.

References

Moths described in 1882
Paracles
Endemic fauna of Chile